The 2021–22 LIU Sharks men's basketball team represented Long Island University in the 2021–22 NCAA Division I men's basketball season. The Sharks, led by fifth-year head coach Derek Kellogg, played their home games at the Steinberg Wellness Center in Brooklyn, New York as members of the Northeast Conference (NEC).

Previous season
The Sharks finished the 2020–21 season 9–9, 9–9 in NEC play to finish in a three-way tie for fifth place. Due to complications caused by the COVID-19 pandemic, only the top four teams were eligible to participate in the NEC tournament.

Roster

Schedule and results

|-
!colspan=12 style=| Non-conference regular season

|-
!colspan=12 style=| NEC regular season

|-
!colspan=9 style=| NEC tournament

Sources

References

LIU Sharks men's basketball seasons
LIU
LIU
LIU